Jeunesse Sportive de la Saoura, known simply as JS Saoura or JSS for short, is an Algerian football club founded in the town of Méridja in the Béchar Province. They take their name from the Saoura valley of southwestern Algeria. The club was founded in 2008 and its  colours are green and yellow. Their home stadium, 20 August Stadium in Béchar, has a capacity of 20,000 spectators. The club is currently playing in the Algerian Ligue Professionnelle 1.

History

Early years
The club formed on June 10, 1968, following the merger of the JSB (Jeunesse Sportive Bécharienne) and the ESD (Étoile du Sud de Debdaba) The club was re-established in September 2008 in the municipality of Méridja and was called as Jeunesse Sportive de la Saoura, was born JS Saoura with 4 disciplines Football - Tennis - Volley ball and judo. During the 2008–09 season, JS Saoura played in the Bechar Regional League, where it finished in first place and won the promotion to Inter-regions. The following season, JS Saoura won the West group of the Inter-region division. During the 2010–11 season, JS Saoura finished first in the Center-West Group of the Ligue Nationale du Football Amateur. This allows him to access Ligue 2. On April 17, 2012, the JSS defeated SA Mohammadia 3–1, to end the season in second place in Ligue 2. The club therefore moved up to Ligue 1 and joined for the first time in its history the elite of Algerian football. The club achieved promotion four times in a row to reach in the 2012–13 season to the Algerian Ligue Professionnelle 1 as the first club from the southwest, and with financing from Entreprise Nationale de Forage (ENAFOR) a firm of the petroleum company Sonatrach with 75% of the shares, the rest is held by the Amateur Sports Club.

Ligue 1 for the first time
In the first season the goal was to ensure survival in the Ligue 1 and gain experience. In the ninth round in a match against USM El Harrach in Bechar, 45 people, including 32 policemen, were injured in accidents among fans. These incidents occurred in the stands, and after the stadium was stormed by USM El Harrach fans in the 65th minute, and in the face of these floods, the referee was forced to stop the match for security reasons as determined. On December 20, 2013, the club signed French coach Alain Michel to become the first foreign coach to lead the club. At the end of the season the star of the team Kaddour Beldjilali, moved to Étoile du Sahel for 360,000 euros, after a great struggle from several clubs. On February 24, 2015, Mustapha Kouici was appointed as the club's general manager for a period of 18 months, Kouici has pledged to put his experience and knowledge at the disposal of the team for the sole purpose of putting it on the right track. Only six months later Kouici was dismissed from his position, and the team's spokesman Mohamed Zerouati said that the new president of the club was the one who took this decision and the contract signed between the two sides allows that. JS Saoura started to impose itself to achieve in the 2015–16 season the runner-up of the Ligue Professionnelle 1, either in the Algerian Cup and after three eliminations from the Round of 64, JSS managed to break the knot and despite that, they was eliminated from the Round of 32 against NA Hussein Dey. The club achieved a record in non-defeat in its stadium, reaching 58 matches from 2015 to September 15, 2018 against CA Bordj Bou Arreridj. and Two seasons after that JS Saoura finished runners–up in the Ligue Professionnelle 1 for the second time, three points ahead of the champion CS Constantine. 

On January 21, 2021, JS Saoura president Mohamed Zerouati was suspended for a year due to his behavior towards the match officials against MC Alger. Zerouati was accused of using pressure with threats against the match official (COVID manager), Zerouati said he was so upset with the COVID manager that a verbal argument broke out between him and the official match doctor. Zerouati in an interview said that the clubs who say that they put pressure on the referees are the same ones who say that they are hospitable when they win, but when they lose, they say the opposite. He said, “Every day of Ligue 1 we take long trips that can reach 3000 km. As for the rest of the clubs, they move only once to Béchar in a season”.

Crest

Shirt sponsor & kit manufacturer

Since the rise of JS Saoura to the Algerian Ligue Professionnelle 1 in the 2012–13 season, the petroleum company Sonatrach subsidiary Entreprise Nationale de Forage (ENAFOR) has become the owner of the majority of the shares with 75%. JS Saoura it was also sponsor by a subsidiary of Groupe Télécom Algérie Mobilis, exactly from November 13, 2013 for one season with four other clubs.

Honours

Domestic Competitions 
 Algerian Ligue Professionnelle 1
Runner-up (2) : 2015–16, 2017–18
 Algerian Ligue Professionnelle 2
Runner-up (1) : 2011–12
 Ligue Nationale (Groupe Centre-Ouest)
Winners (1): 2010–11
 Ligue Inter-Régions (Groupe Ouest)
Winners (1): 2009–10
 Ligue Régional I (Groupe Bechar)
Winners (1): 2008–09

Performance in CAF competitions
JS Saoura whose team has regularly taken part in Confederation of African Football (CAF) competitions. Qualification for Algerian clubs is determined by a team's performance in its domestic league and cup competitions, JS Saoura is the first club from the south of Algeria to participate in a continental competition, and that was in 2017 in the CAF Champions League as the runner-up of the Ligue Professionnelle 1 and they eliminated in the preliminary round against Enugu Rangers and the first continental goal scored by Abderrahmane Bourdim. Two years later, JS Saoura returned to participate in the same competition, where they qualified for the group stage with Al-Ahly, AS Vita Club and Simba of Tanzania. The first match was against Enugu Rangers and ended with a draw 1–1.

 CAF Champions League: 2 appearances
 2017 – Preliminary round
 2018–19 – Group stage

 CAF Confederation Cup: 2 appearance 
 2021–22 – Group stage
 2022–23 – Second round

Players
Algerian teams are limited to two foreign players. The squad list includes only the principal nationality of each player;

Current squad

Reserve Squad

Personnel

Current technical staff

References

External links

 
Football clubs in Algeria
Béchar Province
Algerian Ligue 2 clubs
Association football clubs established in 2008
2008 establishments in Algeria
Sports clubs in Algeria
Algerian Ligue Professionnelle 1 clubs